Mount Zwegabin (Kwekabaw) is a mountain in Myanmar. It is located in Kayin State, in the southern part of the country, around 450 km south of the capital Naypyidaw.

The terrain around Mount Zwegabin is flat to the north-west, but hilly to the south-east. Calculated from the variance of all elevation data (DEM 3 ") from Viewfinder Panoramas, within 10 kilometers radius.  Mount Zwegabin is the highest point in the region. The area around Mount Zwegabin, is quite densely populated, with 155 inhabitants per square kilometer. The closest major city is Hpa-an, 8.2 km northwest of Mount Zwegabin. The surroundings around the mountains are a mosaic of agricultural land and natural vegetation.

See also 
Saddan Cave 
List of mountains in Myanmar

References

External links 

"Viewfinder Panoramas Digital elevation Model" (2015-6-21).
"Zwekabin Taung" said"Geonames.org (cc-by)" Geonames.org]; mail updated 2016-06-01; database download downloaded 2016-10-22
"NASA Earth Observations: Population Density NASA/SEDAO
"NASA Earth Observations: Land Cover Classification" NASA/MODES
Peel, M C; Finlayson, B L."Updated world map of the Köppen-Geiger climate classification " Hydrology and Earth System Sciences 11: p. 1633–1644.
"NASA Earth Observations Data set Index NASA
"NASA Earth Observations: Rainfall (1 month-TRMM) NASA/Tropical Rainfall Monitoring Mission

Kayin State
Zwegabin